Karl F. Friday (born 1957) is an American Japanologist.

Friday earned a bachelor's degree in Japanese at the University of Kansas in 1979, followed by a master's degree in East Asian languages and culture from the same institution in 1983. He then attended Stanford University to pursue graduate study in history, earning a master of arts degree in 1986, followed by a doctorate in 1989. Friday began his teaching career as an assistant professor at the University of San Diego. In 1990, he joined the faculty of the University of Georgia, where he was successively promoted to associate professor in 1993, and full professor in 1999. Upon retiring in 2012, Friday was granted emeritus status. He later served as Director of the IES Abroad Tokyo Center, and as professor, and currently professor emeritus, at Saitama University, in Japan. Friday specialized in the study of samurai history and culture, including Japanese martial arts. Friday also holds menkyo kaiden license in Kashima Shinryū.

Selected publications
 The Routledge Handbook of Premodern Japanese History. Routledge, 2017.
 Japan Emerging: Premodern History to 1850. Routledge, 2012.

References

1957 births
Living people
American Japanologists
American martial arts writers
Historians of Japan
University of Georgia faculty
Stanford University alumni
University of Kansas alumni
University of San Diego faculty
20th-century American male writers
20th-century American historians
21st-century American historians
21st-century American male writers
American martial artists